"Aren't You Kind of Glad We Did?" is a song composed by George Gershwin, with lyrics by Ira Gershwin. Ira Gershwin added the lyrics in the mid-1940s, to an unused tune by his brother, George.

It was introduced by Betty Grable and Dick Haymes in the 1947 film The Shocking Miss Pilgrim.

Notable recordings 
Many other artists have also recorded the song, including:
Peggy Lee along with Dave Barbour and His Orchestra (1946)
Ella Fitzgerald on Ella Fitzgerald Sings the George and Ira Gershwin Song Book (1959)
Melanie C recorded the song for her musical theatre-inspired album Stages (2012)

References

Songs with music by George Gershwin
Songs with lyrics by Ira Gershwin
1946 songs